1421 Esperanto, provisional designation , is a dark background asteroid from the outer regions of the asteroid belt, approximately  in diameter. It was discovered on 18 March 1936, by Finnish astronomer Yrjö Väisälä at the Iso-Heikkilä Observatory in Turku, southwest Finland. The presumed C-type asteroid has a rotation period of nearly 22 hours. It was named for the artificial language Esperanto.

Orbit and classification 

Esperanto has been determined a non-family asteroid from the main belt's background population by means of modern HCM-analysis, after it had previously been grouped to the Eos family by Zappalà in the 1990s.

It orbits the Sun in the outer asteroid belt at a distance of 2.8–3.4 AU once every 5 years and 5 months (1,983 days; semi-major axis of 3.09 AU). Its orbit has an eccentricity of 0.08 and an inclination of 10° with respect to the ecliptic.

Naming 

This minor planet was named by the discoverer after the artificial language, Esperanto, which was created by inventor and writer, Ludwik Lejzer Zamenhof (1859–1917), who used the pseudonym "Doktoro Esperanto". The discoverer also named another asteroid, 1462 Zamenhof, directly after the inventor. Both asteroids are considered to be the most remote Zamenhof-Esperanto objects. The official  was published by the Minor Planet Center in January 1956.

Physical characteristics 

Esperanto is an assumed, carbonaceous C-type asteroid.

Rotation period 

In March 2012, a rotational lightcurve of Esperanto was obtained from photometric observations by Andrea Ferrero at the Bigmuskie Observatory  in northern Italy. Lightcurve analysis gave a rotation period of  hours with a brightness amplitude of 0.15 magnitude.

Diameter and albedo 

According to the surveys carried out by the Infrared Astronomical Satellite IRAS, the Japanese Akari satellite and the NEOWISE mission of NASA's Wide-field Infrared Survey Explorer, Esperanto measures between 43.3 and 64.3 kilometers in diameter and its surface has an albedo between 0.03 and 0.098.

The Collaborative Asteroid Lightcurve Link adopts the results obtained by IRAS, that is, an albedo of 0.0714 and a diameter of 43.31 kilometers based on an absolute magnitude of 10.3.

References

External links 
 Asteroid Lightcurve Database (LCDB), query form (info )
 Dictionary of Minor Planet Names, Google books
 Discovery Circumstances: Numbered Minor Planets (1)-(5000) – Minor Planet Center
 
 

001421
Discoveries by Yrjö Väisälä
Named minor planets
19360318